Robert Ralph Parsons (born November 27, 1950) is an American entrepreneur, billionaire, and  philanthropist. In 1997, he founded the GoDaddy group of companies, including domain name registrar GoDaddy.com, reseller registrar Wild West Domains, and Blue Razor Domains. In July 2011, Parsons sold approximately 70 percent of GoDaddy to a private equity consortium and resigned his position as CEO. In June 2014, he stepped down from his position as Executive Chairman and served on the board until 2018.

Parsons is the founder and CEO of YAM Worldwide, Inc., which is home to his entrepreneurial ventures in the fields of powersports, golf, real estate, and marketing.

In 2012, Parsons and his wife Renee founded The Bob & Renee Parsons Foundation, which provides funding, primarily in the greater Phoenix area, to nonprofit organizations. In December 2013, they joined The Giving Pledge, an initiative started by Bill and Melinda Gates and Warren Buffett that requires signators to commit at least half of their fortunes to charity.

As of September 2020, Parsons is ranked No. 378 on the Forbes 400 list of The Richest People in America.

Background

Parsons was born in Baltimore, Maryland. His family lived in Highlandtown and struggled financially as both of his parents were hard-core gamblers. His mother was a homemaker while his father worked as a furniture salesman for Montgomery Ward. Parsons has said about those days, "I've earned everything I've ever received. Very little was given to me. I've been working as long as I can remember. Whether it was delivering or selling newspapers, pumping gas, working in construction or in a factory, I've always been making my own money."

After nearly flunking out of high school, Parsons enlisted in the United States Marine Corps. He was assigned to the 26th Marine Regiment, which was attached to and operated as part of the 1st Marine Division. In 1969, he served as a rifleman in the Delta Company of the 1st Battalion, 26th Marines, during a tour of duty in Vietnam, in the Quảng Nam Province.

He was wounded in action, medically evacuated, and spent two months at a naval hospital recovering from his wounds. As a result of his service and injury, he earned the Combat Action Ribbon, the Vietnam Gallantry Cross, and the Purple Heart.

Education
In 1975, Parsons obtained an accounting degree from the University of Baltimore, graduating magna cum laude. He then began his career in IT and software sales industry

The University of Baltimore conferred an honorary Doctor of Humane Letters degree on May 21, 2008.

Parsons Technology
In 1984, he founded Parsons Technology in Cedar Rapids, Iowa, and began selling MoneyCounts, a home accounting program. In late 1987, Parsons was able to quit his job and focus completely on selling and overseeing growth of MoneyCounts. Eventually, Parsons Technology grew to be a 1,000-employee, privately held company. On September 27, 1994, Parsons completed the sale of Parsons Technology to Intuit, Inc. for $64 million.

GoDaddy

Parsons founded the Internet domain registrar and Web hosting company GoDaddy in 1997. In July 2011, Parsons sold approximately 70 percent of GoDaddy to a private equity consortium led by KKR & Co. L.P. and Silver Lake, and resigned his position as CEO. In June 2014, Parsons stepped down from his position as Executive Chairman. Parsons announced he would be fully stepping away from GoDaddy in October 2018, relinquishing his board seat.

YAM Worldwide, Inc.
In 2012, Parsons founded the Scottsdale, Arizona-based YAM Worldwide Inc., "home of [Parsons'] entrepreneurship operations ... in the fields of power sports, golf, real estate, marketing, innovation and philanthropy."

YAM Capital is YAM Worldwide's private lending and investment arm, specializing in commercial real estate lending and acquisition of closely held middle-market companies.

In 2013, Parsons acquired Martz Agency, a 25-employee public relations firm in Scottsdale, Arizona. In 2015, Bob Parsons rebranded the firm to BIG YAM, The Parsons Agency, a full-service advertising agency in Scottsdale, Arizona.

In 2016, Parsons launched Sneaky Big Studios in Scottsdale at the YAM Worldwide Center where much of YAM Worldwide is based. Sneaky Big Studio provides production, post-production, and recording studio services including editorial, visual effects, color finishing, and audio.

In 2017, Parsons established The YAMWOOD Foundry, a business that creates custom, unique furniture, signs, and lighting fixtures for residential and commercial projects.

Motorcycle dealerships
YAM Worldwide subsidiaries LZ Delta, L.L.C. and MS LZ Delta, L.L.C. operate Harley-Davidson and multi-brand motorcycle dealerships in Arizona, Mississippi, and Tennessee. They include:
 GoAZ Motorcycles (multi-brand dealership), Scottsdale, Arizona
 GoAZ Motorcycles (multi-brand dealership), Peoria, Arizona
 Harley-Davidson of Scottsdale, Scottsdale, Arizona
 Southern Thunder Harley-Davidson, Southaven, Mississippi

Parsons is also founder and CEO of Scottsdale-based Spooky Fast Customs, which creates customized motorcycle designs and fabrications.

In April 2014, Parsons announced plans to build the "world's largest Harley-Davidson dealership" in Scottsdale. Harley-Davidson of Scottsdale opened in 2015, the two-story, 150,000 square-foot dealership includes a lingerie boutique, tattoo and piercing parlor, arcade, movie theater, and wedding chapel.

Golf
In September 2013, Parsons purchased The Golf Club Scottsdale, a 292-acre members-only golf course, for $600,000 and undisclosed debt, and renamed it Scottsdale National Golf Club. In 2014, Parsons purchased undeveloped properties adjacent to his golf course including a 223-acre parcel for a reported $55 million, a 41-acre parcel for $5.4 million, and a smaller tract for $2.3 million. Also in 2014, Parsons announced plans to build a new clubhouse, nine-hole practice facility, and second 18-hole golf course on the property.

Parsons Xtreme Golf (PXG)

In January 2015, Parsons launched Parsons Xtreme Golf (PXG), a high-end golf club manufacturing company. The same month, professional golfer Ryan Moore used prototype PXG irons and wedges when he played in the Hyundai Tournament of Champions, a PGA Tour event. With more than 200 U.S. and foreign patents, PXG now sells a full line of golf clubs. PXG's professional staff includes PGA tour champions  Zach Johnson,  Pat Perez,  Billy Horschel,  James Hahn,  Ryan Moore,  Charl Schwartzel,  Scott Langley, and  Wyndham Clark and LPGA players  Lydia Ko,  Anna Nordqvist,  Katherine Kirk,  Austin Ernst,  Christina Kim,  Brittany Lang,  Alison Lee,  Celine Boutier, and  Ryann O'Toole.

Real estate holdings
Since 2012, YAM Properties has purchased more than 675,000 square feet of commercial real estate in Arizona's Valley of the Sun region. YAM properties include:

 Scottsdale Grayhawk Center, 147,084-square-foot retail plaza, acquired for $36.885 million
 Retail and office projects Citadelle Plaza and II Palazzo, acquired for $27.3 million
 Arrowhead Professional Center, a 71,066-square-foot office project, acquired for $13.25 million
 Retail space in two properties that total 66,983 square feet, acquired for $8.575 million
 McDowell Mountain Marketplace, an 84,087-square-foot retail center, acquired for $14.125 million
 Centerpoint on Mill, a 127,027-square-foot mixed-use development, acquired for $38.35 million
 Hayden Station, a 107,508-square-foot mixed-used development, acquired for $26.5 million
 The Cornerstone shopping center, acquired for $29 million
 Westgate Entertainment District, 533,000 square feet of retail, office and residential space; Located adjacent to Gila River Arena, in Glendale, Arizona. It was acquired in June 2018 for $133 million
Shops at Norterra, paid $108 million in cash for the open-air shopping and restaurant development at Interstate 17 and Happy Valley Road

The Bob & Renee Parsons Foundation

In 2012, Bob and Renee Parsons established the Bob and Renee Parsons Foundation. Since then, the Foundation has awarded to more than 96 charities and organizations worldwide. A third of the total money awarded has been spent in local Arizonian charities. Bob Parsons was said to have resigned his position as executive chairman at GoDaddy in order to devote more time to his other interests, among them his foundation, while Renee Parsons manages the foundation on a day-to-day basis.

They have joined Bill and Melinda Gates and Warren Buffett's The Giving Pledge in 2010 and agreed to donate half their wealth to charity. Since its inception, The foundation has donated over $10 million on a yearly basis, placing it among the state's 10 biggest givers.

The foundation receives funding requests from charities through its Web site, and subsequently evaluates them and makes donations based on the requesting charities needs. Its main focus areas can be categorized in disaster relief, veterans, and the Phoenix community. After the 2010 Haiti earthquake, The foundation pledged $500 thousand for Hope for Haiti and a further $4 million towards relief efforts. The Bob and Renee Parsons Foundation has supported several veterans' organizations, mainly the Semper Fi Fund, with donations exceeding $8.5 million, mostly in the form of matching donations. In or around Phoenix, Arizona, it has donated more than $8 million to United Methodist Outreach Centers (UMOM) and its New Day Centers, which the organization spent in part to pay off the mortgage for one of its biggest facilities. It has also donated at least $10 million to the Southwest Center for HIV/AIDS, helping it open its new center.

Other projects the foundation was involved with include the W. M. Keck Observatory in Hawaii, which amounted to three grants totaling $3.7 million to upgrade its laser system; the Girl Scouts through the Girl Scouts Beyond Bars program; $4 million in scholarship funds for theDream.us; a $1.5 million grant to the Phoenix Children's Hospital in support of one of its community outreach programs; $1 million towards the Barrow Neurological Institute at St. Joseph's Hospital and Medical Center; $1.4 million for the Murphy Kids Dental Clinic; and $2 million to Circle the City, in order for the organization to launch a new primary healthcare center.

Political activities
In 2012, Parsons donated $1 million to Restore Our Future, Mitt Romney's Super PAC.

On December 8, 2016, Parsons donated $1 million to 58th Presidential Inaugural Committee. 

In the January 9, 2017 episode (around the 45:00 mark) of The Forward Podcast with Lance Armstrong, Parsons proudly proclaimed "I'm a Deplorable!" and stated that Donald Trump had been his early choice among the 17 major candidates in the 2016 Republican Primary. "[Trump] was the guy that always resonated with me. [...] Everything so far he said he'd do he's done, which is almost unheard of in politics, he gets no credit for it! [...] I think when everything is all said and done, he's gonna be one of the best presidents we've ever had."

Controversies
In 2011, Parsons was denounced by animal rights and other groups for tweeting a video in which he shoots and kills an elephant in Zimbabwe. In response to the shooting, Gawker called Parsons "insane"  and "ridiculous." NBC News said "It's definitely the kind of thing only a super rich CEO/founder of a held company could get away with." Parsons said, "elephants are not endangered and probably there are too many of them." According to Convention on International Trade in Endangered Species of Wild Fauna and Flora elephants are listed as Schedule II.

GoDaddy was criticized as sexist for advertising practices between its first Super Bowl ad in 2005 through the company's IPO in 2014. "The Go Daddy girl was my idea," Parsons said. "I told the ad agency, I want a really well-endowed, good-looking gal in a tight T-shirt, with our name right across her breasts." He used his blog to draw attention to ads that were rejected from television as too racy.

References

1950 births
Living people
American bloggers
American computer businesspeople
United States Marine Corps personnel of the Vietnam War
Businesspeople in information technology
Giving Pledgers
21st-century philanthropists
Golf people
United States Marines
University of Baltimore alumni
People from Scottsdale, Arizona
GoDaddy